Pravitoceras is an extinct genus of ammonites. They were fast-moving nektonic carnivores that existed from 84.9 to 70.6 million years ago in Japan.

References

Ammonitida genera
Nostoceratidae